Rzhaksa is an urban locality (an urban-type settlement) in Rzhaksinsky District of Tambov Oblast, Russia. Population:

References

Urban-type settlements in Tambov Oblast
Kirsanovsky Uyezd